The 2007 Japan Open Super Series (officially known as the Yonex Open Japan Super Series 2007 for sponsorship reasons) was a badminton tournament which took place at Tokyo Metropolitan Gymnasium in Tokyo, Japan, from 11 to 16 September 2007 and had a total purse of $200,000.

Tournament 
The 2007 Japan Open Super Series was the eighth tournament of the 2007 BWF Super Series and also part of the Japan Open championships, which had been held since 1977. This tournament was organized by the Nippon Badminton Association and sanctioned by the BWF.

Venue 
This international tournament was held at Tokyo Metropolitan Gymnasium in Tokyo, Japan.

Point distribution 
Below is the point distribution for each phase of the tournament based on the BWF points system for the BWF Super Series event.

Prize money 
The total prize money for this tournament was US$200,000. Distribution of prize money was in accordance with BWF regulations.

Men's singles

Seeds 

 Lin Dan (semi-finals)
 Bao Chunlai (first round)
 Chen Hong (first round)
 Lee Chong Wei (champion)
 Chen Jin (quarter-finals)
 Peter Gade (quarter-finals)
 Chen Yu (second round)
 Kenneth Jonassen (second round)

Finals

Top half

Section 1

Section 2

Bottom half

Section 3

Section 4

Women's singles

Seeds 

 Zhang Ning (quarter-finals)
 Xie Xingfang (final)
 Zhu Lin (first round)
 Wang Chen (quarter-finals)
 Pi Hongyan (quarter-finals)
 Huaiwen Xu (first round)
 Lu Lan (semi-finals)
 Petya Nedelcheva (withdrew)

Finals

Top half

Section 1

Section 2

Bottom half

Section 3

Section 4

Men's doubles

Seeds 

 Cai Yun / Fu Haifeng (second round)
 Koo Kien Keat / Tan Boon Heong (second round)
 Markis Kido / Hendra Setiawan (semi-finals)
 Candra Wijaya /  Tony Gunawan (champions)
 Jens Eriksen / Martin Lundgaard Hansen (second round)
 Choong Tan Fook / Lee Wan Wah (second round)
 Jung Jae-sung / Lee Yong-dae (second round)
 Hwang Ji-man / Lee Jae-jin (quarter-finals)

Finals

Top half

Section 1

Section 2

Bottom half

Section 3

Section 4

Women's doubles

Seeds 

 Wei Yili / Zhang Yawen (semi-finals)
 Gao Ling / Huang Sui (semi-finals)
 Yang Wei / Zhang Jiewen (champions)
 Cheng Wen-hsing / Chien Yu-chin (quarter-finals)
 Yu Yang / Zhao Tingting (final)
 Gail Emms / Donna Kellogg (second round)
 Kumiko Ogura / Reiko Shiota (second round)
 Chin Eei Hui / Wong Pei Tty (first round)

Finals

Top half

Section 1

Section 2

Bottom half

Section 3

Section 4

Mixed doubles

Seeds 

 Zheng Bo / Gao Ling (champions)
 Nova Widianto / Liliyana Natsir (final)
 Xie Zhongbo / Zhang Yawen (second round)
 Nathan Robertson / Gail Emms (second round)
 Anthony Clark / Donna Kellogg (quarter-finals)
 Flandy Limpele / Vita Marissa (quarter-finals)
 Sudket Prapakamol / Saralee Thungthongkam (quarter-finals)
 He Hanbin / Yu Yang (second round)

Finals

Top half

Section 1

Section 2

Bottom half

Section 3

Section 4

References

External links 
Tournament link

Japan Open (badminton)
Japan Open
2007 in Japanese sport